Max Ferdinand Karl von Boehn (16 August 1850 − 18 February 1921) was a German officer involved in the Franco-Prussian War and World War I. He held the rank of Generaloberst in World War I.

Life

Early life
Max von Boehn was born in Bromberg, Kingdom of Prussia (modern Bydgoszcz, Poland) into the Pomeranian  noble family von Boehn. He was the son of the later Prussian Lieutenant General Julius Heinrich von Boehn (1820–1893) and his wife Luise Henriette Josepha, née Cords (17 November 1830 Mischwitz at Hohensalza − 19 August 1883 in Berlin). His younger brother, Hans von Boehn (1853–1931) also embarked on a military career, rising to the rank of cavalry general. The subsequent Prussian General of the Infantry and commanding general of the VI. Army Corps,  Oktavio Philipp von Boehn (1824–1899) was his uncle. Boehn attended schools in Thorn, Stolp and Berlin,

Military career
Boehn joined the Third Guard Regiment of the Prussian Army as a three-year volunteer on 6 December 1867 at Hanover. Boehn attainted his officer's commission on 15 June and was appointed to Portepeefähnrich on 7 July 1868. Boehn next promotion was to second lieutenant on 9 March 1869. On 4 February 1870 he was transferred to Hamburg, with the 8th Company of the 76th (2nd Hanseatic) Infantry Regiment.

Franco-Prussian War
During the Franco-Prussian War of 1870–1871, von Boehn participated in the Sieges of Metz, Toul, and Paris as well as the battles at Dreux, Bellême and partially at La Madeleine-Bouvet. He was slightly wounded at the Battle of Loigny  by a shot in his right arm and awarded with the Iron Cross and the Mecklenburg Military Merit Cross for his achievements.

From 13 May 1872 to 1 October 1875, Boehn was appointed adjutant of the II. Battalion. A month later, he became an aide to the district headquarters in Hamburg for two years. Boehn was temporarily assigned to  the First Battalion of the 2nd Hanseatic Landwehr Regiment No. 76, and was promoted to the rank of first lieutenant on 11 January 1876. From 1 August through 16 November 1878, he was required to attend the field artillery school. On 22 March 1881 he was ordered to be transferred to the newly formed Infantry Regiment Nr. 97, effective 1 April 1881. Boehn became adjutant of the 2nd Grand Ducal Hessian 50th Infantry Brigade. From 22 June 1882 through 14 October 1882 he was assigned to the 4th Guards (Infantry). Upon completion of this assignment, he was promoted to captain and assigned for six years as company commander of 12th Company of the Kaiser Alexander Guards Grenadier Regiment No. 1 in Berlin. Boehn remained in Berlin and became an aide to the 1st Guards Infantry Division. On 21 September 1889, he was promoted to major. On 27 July 1890 Boehn became adjutant to the General Command of the Guards Corps. Boehn then returned to field command, being appointed commander of the Fusilier-Battalion in Kaiser Alexander Guard Grenadier Regiment No. 1, on 27 January 1892.

As a staff officer in charge of budgets, Boehn was assigned to the 3rd Guards Regiment of Infantry on 13 May 1895. On 18 June 1895, he was promoted to lieutenant colonel. Boehn returned to Hamburg in 1897 and on 20 July was appointed commander of the 2nd Infantry Hanseatic Regiment No. 76. With his promotion to colonel on 18 November 1897, he was appointed as regimental commander. Boehn was assigned to the 9th Infantry Brigade in Frankfurt (Oder), on 18 May 1901. With his promotion to major general on 16 June, he became commander. He was ordered to attend the Field Artillery School information course at Jüterbog in May 1904. Boehn next promotion was on 22 April 1905 to lieutenant general and became commander of the 18th division in Flensburg.

On 1 September 1909, Boehn was promoted to General of the Infantry. He succeeded Wilhelm von Uslar as governor of the Fortress of Ulm on 2 December 1909. King William II of Württemberg awarded him the Grand Cross of the Friedrich Order in June 1911. While serving with the Infantry Regiment "Hamburg" (Hanseatic 2.) No. 76, Boehn was relieved of his command on 21 September 1912, for retirement with pension. He spent his retirement in Naumburg.

World War I
With the mobilization at the outbreak of World War I, Boehn was reactivated as a General of Infantry Reserve and appointed the commanding general of the IX Reserve Corps. Called "North Army," his first obligation was the guarding of the coast in Schleswig-Holstein as well as the protection of the strategically important Kaiser Wilhelm Canal from a possible invasion, until 22 August 1914. After these initial fears were found groundless, the corps transferred to Belgium on 23 August. It was on 25 August in Leuven implicated in alleged skirmishes that would later be reported as war crimes. Following were battles at near Mechelen and around the Fortress Termonde, until major formation came to the aid of the beleaguered army's right wing from Saint-Quentin. On 14 September the corps reached Noyon and advanced toward Carlepont. In October 1914, the front stabilized between Roye and Noyon, followed by struggles at Laucourt. Beginning in January 1915 the IX Reserve Corps was deployed for the Battle of Soissons.

From the end of August until 17 September 1915, Boehn also acted as deputy commander of the 1st Army (German Empire). After its disbandment on 17 September, the IX Reserve Corps was subordinated to the 2nd Army (German Empire) and later on 21 October 1915 to the 6th Army (German Empire). This was followed by trench warfare in Flanders and Artois. The Battle of Verdun began on 21 February 1916 and at Angres, the so-called "Gießler-height" was stormed. Fights at Givenchy followed. Reporting to the re-formed 1st Army, the IX Reserve Corps on 19 July 1916, participated in the Battle of the Somme. For the defensive success of his troops in the fighting, Boehn received the Pour le Mérite on 24 August 1916. From 25 August, the corps fought with the 6th Army again in Flanders and Artois, before returning to the Somme on 26 September 1916. From 26 October the corps was with the 4th Army in position for the battles on the Yser.

On 10 September 1914, Army Group "Strantz" was formed from other depleted corps, named after its commander. On 2 February 1917, the group was renamed Army Group C and was assigned to Boehn as its new commander in chief. Under his command they fought on the Maas Heights. On 11 March 1917, Boehn was transferred as commander to the 7th Army. Under his leadership, the army was deployed to the Winter Battle of Champagne, the position battles on the Aisne and the double battle of the Aisne and Champagne. After heavy fighting on the Chemin des Dames and repeatedly foiled attempts to break through, Boehn received on 20 May 1917, the Oak Leaves to the Pour le Mérite. Later in the year, the army was involved in the north of the Ailette and in October at the Battle of Malmaison.

Max von Boehn celebrated on 5 December 1917 in Marle, his 50th military service anniversary. His king honored him with the award of the Grand Order of the Red Eagle with Oak Leaves and Swords.

At the beginning of German spring offensive or Kaiserschlacht in France, Boehn was promoted to Colonel General on 22 March 1918. During the German offensive, the army penetrated to the west but had ceased their advance on 6 April. On 27 May, he was able to proceed aggressively again, negotiating the Chemin des Dames, the Aisne-Marne Canal, the Aisne and the Vesle. Boehn further managed to conquer the forts on the West Front of Reims. Within days Boehn's units had achieved territorial gains of  depth, captured 60,000 prisoners of war and seized 830 guns and 2,000 machine guns. For these achievements, Wilhelm II appointed him Chief of the Schleswig-Holstein Infantry Regiment No. 163 on 30 May 1918. Six days later, in Fressancourt, Boehn welcomed his regiment which had been transferred from the 4th to the 7th Army. Boehn was knighted and dubbed a Knight of the Order of the Black Eagle.

Assault warfare again switched to trench warfare. Boehn's  army fought between the Oise, Aisne and Marne. A final assault battle of the Marne and in Champagne developed into a defensive battle, between Soissons and Reims and between Marne and Vesle. In the end the German troops were driven back to a line before the Spring Offensive. (Battle of the Marne)

On 6 August 1918 Boehn was appointed the Commander-in-Chief of the Army Group Boehn which was formed  on 12 August 1918 from the 2nd, 9th, and 18th armies to defend the Siegfried Line (Hindenburg Line) in the southern Artois between Oise and Somme. It was the last of its kind in this war. When the superiority of the Allies forced the surrender of the Army Group, it was dissolved on 8 October 1918. Boehn received at his request on 31 October 1918 the command of the 7th Army. After fighting in the Hunding and the Antwerp–Meuse position, the cease fire ending the war was proclaimed on 11 November 1918 at Compiègne.

Boehn conceded the occupied territory and at the end of November 1918, and reached Marburg. Boehn's units were demobilized on 18 January and he was decommissioned on 27 January 1919. After his decommission, he lived in Charlottenburg. The local "Association of officers of the former Kaiser Alexander Garde Grenadier Regiment. 1" appointed him honorary chairman. Boehn died at age 70 in Sommerfeld and was interred at the Invalids' Cemetery in Berlin. His burial place, like that of his father, has not been preserved.

Family
Boehn married Martha Elsner (born 2 March 1854 in Groß Rosenburg Castle in Sommerfeld) on 25 September 1873 in Groß Rosenburg. Four children were born:
Volkhart (born 23 June 1874 in Hamburg; died 7 January 1937 in Potsdam), German Major
Wanda (born 14 November 1878 in Schwerin; died 16 November 1971 in Berlin)
Josepha (born 26 May 1883 in Berlin, died 20 September 1946 in Coburg)
Armgard (born 4 December 1885 in Berlin, died 22 April 1971 in Munich)

Boehn barracks
After the First World War, the Treaty of Versailles induced reduction of the German army caused the city of Hamburg to be demilitarized for nearly 15 years. The barracks were now mostly used for social purposes. This would change in 1935 with the army re-formed by the Third Reich. Hamburg soon became one of the garrisons within the Reich.

In 1936, the grounds of the Boehn Barracks in Hamburg-Rahlstedt were acquired by various previous owners, and rebuilt. Named after the old regimental commander, the barracks was completed in March 1936 and assigned to the Infantry Regiment 76 of the Wehrmacht.

In 1994, only the monument at Dammtor, a memorial stone in the Boehn Barracks opposite the former headquarters building of Panzergrenadierbrigade 17 and a bronze relief on the officer's home, remember the 76th. In addition, the building contains a stone relief, depicting Max von Boehn. The brigade left Hamburg in 1993.

Awards
In addition to the aforementioned orders and decorations Boehn received in the course of his military career the following awards:
Honorary Grand Cross of the Oldenburg House and House and Merit Order of Peter Frederick Louis in October 1905
Crown Order of First Class Order of the Crown (Prussia)  on 17 January 1909
Mecklenburgisches Military Merit Cross First Class Military Merit Cross (Mecklenburg-Schwerin) on 24 December 1914 
Hanseatic Cross Lübeck Hanseatic Cross on 2 January 1915 
Star of the Commanders of the Royal House Order of Hohenzollern with swords 
Military Merit Cross (Bavaria) I. Class with swords on 22 February 1917

Sources

Literature
Karl-Friedrich Hildebrand, Christian Zweng: The Knight of the Order Pour le Mérite the First World War. Volume 1: A-G. Biblio Verlag. Osnabrück 1999. . S. 139–141.
Walter Killy: German Biographical Encyclopedia. 1995. .
Hanns Möller: History of the Knights of the Order Pour le Mérite in World War II. Volume I: AL. Publisher Bernard & Graefe. Berlin 1934. pp. 108–110.
Thomas Nigel: The German Army in World War I. Oxford: Osprey 2003 .
Fritz Willich:  Boehn, Max Ferdinand Carl von. In: New German Biography (NDB). Volume 2, Duncker & Humblot, Berlin 1955, S. 395 (digitized).
Oskar von Lindequist:. Commemorative sheets for rank-list of Kaiser Alexander Guard Grenadiers Edition 1. Publisher Moeser.
Soldiers Yearbook 1971, p 189th
Officer strain list of royal Prussian 3rd Foot Guards on foot. From 1860 to 1910. Publisher Gerhard Stalling. Oldenburg 1910. p. 20
Harry Rege: Officer strain list of Infantry Regiment Nr. 76 ; 1902, No. 9, page 9

References

|-

Colonel generals of Prussia
German military personnel of the Franco-Prussian War
German Army generals of World War I
1850 births
1921 deaths
Military personnel from Bydgoszcz
People from the Province of Posen
Recipients of the Pour le Mérite (military class)
Recipients of the Military Merit Cross (Mecklenburg-Schwerin), 1st class
Recipients of the Hanseatic Cross (Lübeck)
19th-century Prussian military personnel